Troy Township, Ohio may refer to:

Troy Township, Ashland County, Ohio
Troy Township, Athens County, Ohio
Troy Township, Delaware County, Ohio
Troy Township, Geauga County, Ohio
Troy Township, Morrow County, Ohio
Troy Township, Richland County, Ohio
Troy Township, Wood County, Ohio

See also
Troy Township (disambiguation)

Ohio township disambiguation pages